Peter Massalski is a former East German slalom canoeist who competed in the 1970s.

He won four medals at the ICF Canoe Slalom World Championships with a gold (C-1 team: 1977) and three silvers (C-1: 1977; C-1 team: 1973, 1975).

References

German male canoeists
Living people
Year of birth missing (living people)
Medalists at the ICF Canoe Slalom World Championships